Fanny Segers (born 13 September 1999 in Annonay) is a French professional squash player. As of December 2018, she was ranked number 180 in the world.

References

1999 births
Living people
French female squash players
People from Annonay
Sportspeople from Ardèche